was a Japanese sprinter. He competed in the men's 4 × 400 metres relay at the 1936 Summer Olympics.

References

1913 births
1977 deaths
Place of birth missing
Japanese male sprinters
Japanese male hurdlers
Olympic male sprinters
Olympic male hurdlers
Olympic athletes of Japan
Athletes (track and field) at the 1936 Summer Olympics
Japan Championships in Athletics winners
20th-century Japanese people